CHBI-FM is a community radio station that operates at 95.7 MHz (FM) in Burnt Islands, Newfoundland and Labrador, Canada.

Owned by the Burnt Islands Economic Development Board, the station was licensed in 2004.

References

External links
Burnt Islands 95.7 FM
Burnt Islands, Newfoundland and Labrador
 

Hbi
Hbi